Drury Ridge is a mainly snow-covered ridge, 9 nautical miles (17 km) long, extending west from Nelson Peak in the Neptune Range, Pensacola Mountains. It was mapped by the United States Geological Survey from surveys and U.S. Navy air photos, 1956–66, and was named by the Advisory Committee on Antarctic Names for David L. Drury, a meteorologist at Ellsworth Station summer 1959–60 and winter 1961.

References 

Ridges of Queen Elizabeth Land